The Greater Hood Memorial AME Zion Church was the first black church in Harlem, New York.  It now receives notoriety as the "Oldest Continuing" church in Harlem. The church’s first house of worship was erected on East 117th Street, between 2nd and 3rd Avenues in 1843.

History 

Greater Hood Memorial A.M.E. Zion Church is the 1st black church to be established in the Harlem and now the oldest church to be exclusively located in Harlem, having been in Harlem long before Harlem itself became a predominantly black community. The first name of the congregation was the Harlem A.M.E. Zion Church, nicknamed, "Little Zion." It was given the nickname because the church was started as the uptown branch of Mother A.M.E. Zion Church, the mother church of the A.M.E. Zion denomination (located then in lower Manhattan), to serve those African Americans who were working as servants on the estates that occupied Harlem in the early and mid-nineteenth century. Subsequent names of this congregation have been Rush Memorial, Hood Memorial and now Greater Hood Memorial.

The church’s founding date is confirmed in a letter from the 1st Bishop, James Varick, dated 1825 in which he states the founding date of March 25, 1820. That letter also notes the founder, Rev. VanHas, as “the minister in charge of the aforesaid church in Harlem.

Years later, under the leadership of the Rev. J.A. King, the 66-member congregation of Harlem A.M.E. Zion Church erected its first structure, a small brick building, in the early part of 1843. Tension arose between "Little Zion" and Mother Zion over who had control of the property at 117th Street. The Trustees of Mother Zion claimed title to the property. The issue would not be resolved until 1910 when the Supreme Court ruled in favor of "Little Zion."

As early as 1909, there was a clamoring for a new edifice. The migration of African Americans from the South had brought an increase in membership. A building fund was started, but a new location was not secured until 1911. Upon completion, the church was to be renamed the Rush Memorial A.M.E. Zion Church in honor of Christopher, the second Bishop of the denomination. On October 15, 1911, the cornerstone was laid at the new site, 58-60 West 138th Street, near Lenox Avenue. Bishops Walters, Clinton, and Caldwell were in attendance for the ceremonies, The Rev. Beverly C. Ransom, Pastor of Bethel A.M.E. Church in Manhattan, delivered the dedicatory sermon.

During the 1920s, the church increased in esteem among its peers. It was one of the most respected churches in New York City. Bishops who presided over the various Episcopal Districts within the A.M.E. Zion Church graced Rush Memorial's pulpit regularly. Under the leadership of Dr. G.M. Oliver, the church experienced phenomenal growth, taking in 600 new members between 1920 and 1925. One hundred seventy-five new members alone joined between 1924 and 1925. During this time the church's auditorium and vestry were renovated at the cost of $25,000 and many of the church's debts were paid off.

Rush Memorial, like the nation, was caught in the grips of the Great Depression during the 1930s. As the income of the membership began to decline and others lost their jobs completely, the church began to fall into arrears in its mortgage payments. As a result, the congregation lost their building in 1935. The congregation was forced to rely on the largess of other churches to hold their worship services. One of the earliest churches to lend a hand was Rev. T.J.B. Harris and the congregation of Rendall Memorial Presbyterian Church, 65 West 137th Street.

At the 114th Session of the New York Annual Conference, held at the Ralph Avenue A.M.E. Zion Church in Brooklyn in June 1935, Bishop Kyles appointed then pastor Rev. W. W. Prime to pastor in Mt. Kisco, NY and brought Rev. B.J, McClellan from South Carolina to pastor the beleaguered congregation. At the New York Annual Conference held at Mother Zion in 1936, Rev. McClellan was returned to the congregation, which was worshipping at 57-61 West 137th Street. It is in the official minutes of this conference that the name of the congregation is listed as Hood Memorial A.M.E. Zion Church. The Church had been renamed in honor of Bishop James Walker Hood.

By 1937, Rev McClellan was actively searching for larger quarters for the church. During the same year, a four-story building was purchased at 229 Lenox Avenue. Not willing to lose another edifice, the congregation burned the mortgage by 1947. In the early part of 1938 dedicatory services were held at the new church edifice. Celebratory services were held during the entire month of March. Although some of the members had scattered since losing the Rush Memorial building in 1935, 200 people had joined the congregation since Rev. McClellan took over as pastor. In June of that year, Hood Memorial A.M.E. Zion Church played host to the 117th Session of the New York Annual Conference. The congregation was highly praised for its progress and the hospitality it demonstrated as host. According to Bishop Kyles, who presided over the conference, it was one of the best sessions he had ever held.

The congregation was assured of not losing its edifice, having burned the mortgage in 1947, but by then it had also outgrown the 229 Lenox Avenue site. Rev. McClellan had passed during the same year. Thus, upon appointment to the church, it became the task of the Rev. James W. Wactor (who became a bishop in 1972) to secure a new edifice for the growing congregation. The former Lido Pool, a dance hall and recreation center, at 160 West 146th Street was purchased between the end of 1949 and early part of 1950 at a price of $122,000. It cost $50,000 for alterations to make the building ready for worship. The completed remodeling work pushed the total expenditure for the building to nearly $200.000.

On July 22, 1951, following a parade through the streets of Harlem to celebrate the church's move, Greater Hood Memorial A.M.E. Zion Church was dedicated to the glory of God by the late Bishop William J. Walls, the presiding Bishop over the New York Conference. The services began at 4 pm with a capacity crowd of 1,500 people in attendance. From its humble beginnings, the congregation had moved from being "Little" to truly being "Great."

There were, however, several members who did not leave the work at 229 Lenox Avenue. The New York Conference purchased the building and the remaining members began Walter's Memorial African Methodist Episcopal Zion Church. They enjoyed many years of success as they continued the work their sister Church left for them to do.
 
Greater Hood Memorial has had their share of pastors after Reverend Wactor. Reverend Churchill was assigned to continue the work after Reverend Wactor, and the congregation continued to grow. Others who followed to take the helm of this church include Rev. David Pharr who was later appointed Presiding Elder of the Long Island District of the New York Conference; Rev. George Miller, Rev. Madison J. McRae, Rev. Albert Pitts, Rev, David Hoffman, Rev. Charles Wilson, Rev. Wilbert Davis, Reverend Isidoa Branch, Sr., who was also appointed Presiding Elder of the Long Island District of the New York Conference, Reverend Dr. Stephen W. Pogue, founder of Hip-Hop Church, Reverend William L. Campbell, Reverend Kenneth Van Lew, and Reverend Freeman Perry. The current pastor, appointed June 2018, is Reverend Julius Walls, Jr.

In 2004, when we celebrated our 184th Anniversary, we received a Proclamation from New York City Councilman Bill Perkins recognizing our church as the "Oldest Continuous Black Church in Harlem."

Timeline 
1820: Congregation recognized as "Little" Mother Zion Church
1843: Brick building built on 117th St
1865–77: Reconstruction Era
1909: Little Zion renamed Rush Memorial in the presence of membership increase and building fund started
1911: Building completed at 58–60 W.138 St.
1920: One of the most respected churches in New York City
1920-25: 600 new members; 175 new members joined in 1924–1925 alone
1935: Lost building
1936: 57-61 West 137th Street, Church renamed Hood Memorial A.M.E. Zion in honor of Bishop James Walker Hood.
1937: Under the leadership or Reverend James McClellan a four-story building was purchased at 229 Lenox Avenue.
1938: 200 new members 
1949: Membership again outgrew site: Purchased site at 160 W. 146th St.
2004: Hip Hop Church founded by Rev. Dr. Stephen Pogue, Rev. Kurtis "Kurtis Blow" Walker and Greater Hood Memorial member John Wright. Receives “Proclamation” from NYC Councilman Bill Perkins recognizing it as the “Oldest Continuous Black Church in Harlem"

Hip Hop Church 

One of the more celebrated ministries at Greater Hood is Hip Hop Church. founded by Kurtis Blow; Stephen Pogue and John Wright. It received world-wide acclaim for ministering to those who would not attend a regular Sunday Service. Every Thursday night at 7:00 p.m. gospel rap, hip-hop beats, gospel music and preaching.  Many have given their lives to the Lord through the Hip Hop Church experience.

References

Churches in Manhattan
African-American history in New York City
1843 establishments in New York (state)